Kodni is a village in Belgaum district in Karnataka, India.

References

It is famous for tobacco cultivation.

Villages in Belagavi district